Franklyn Ajaye (born May 13, 1949) is an American stand-up comedian, actor, and writer. His nickname is "The Jazz Comedian" for his distinctive jazz-inflected style of delivery, timing, and use of silence. He released a series of comedy albums starting in 1973 and has acted in film and television shows from the 1970s through the present, including as a primary character in the 1976 ensemble comedy Car Wash and a supporting role in Sam Peckinpah's Convoy (1978).

Life and career
Ajaye was born in Brooklyn, New York, but raised in Los Angeles by a Sierra Leonean father, after whom he is named, and an American mother (named Quetta), making Ajaye, as he likes to joke, a "true African-American". He has released five comedy albums to date: Franklyn Ajaye, Comedian (1973), I'm a Comedian, Seriously (1974), Don't Smoke Dope, Fry Your Hair (1977), Plaid Pants and Psychopaths (1986), and Vagabond Jazz & the Abstract Truth (2004). The last two were recorded in Sydney and Melbourne, Australia.

Ajaye made his network debut on The Flip Wilson Show in 1973 and made his first appearance on The Tonight Show Starring Johnny Carson a year later. Ajaye emigrated to Melbourne, Australia, in 1997 but returns to the United States periodically to do work on television. His last American television appearance was on Paul Provenza's The Greenroom on Showtime in 2011. He is known in Australia for his appearances on The Panel and Thank God You're Here and for his popular one-man shows "Nothing But The Truth", "Talkin' Vagabond Jazz", and "Vagabond Jazz & The Abstract Truth" at the Melbourne International Comedy Festival.

He has worked as an actor, appearing in films such as Sweet Revenge (1976), Car Wash (1976), Convoy (1978), Stir Crazy (1980), the 1980 version of The Jazz Singer, Hysterical (1982), Get Crazy (1983), Fraternity Vacation (1985), Hollywood Shuffle (1987), The Wrong Guys (1988), The 'Burbs (1989), and American Yakuza (1993). He also appeared on an episode of Barney Miller as police-car thief Wendell Frasier  in 1976. He has been seen more recently in the TV show Deadwood as Samuel Fields and reprised that role in 2019's Deadwood: The Movie. In 2011, Ajaye had a small but memorable role in the box office hit Bridesmaids, playing the father of Lillian (played by Maya Rudolph), and in 2013 he played management guru Marvin Hudsfield in the Australian ABC sitcom Utopia. He has been nominated twice for Emmy Awards for Outstanding Writing in a Variety or Music Program for In Living Color (1990) and Politically Incorrect (1997).

He has worked on the hit family comedy series created and executive-produced by Robert Townsend, The Parent 'Hood (January 1995 - July 1999); some of his credits on the show include acting as "executive consultant" with Barry "Berry" Douglas in season 1 episode 9 ("Trial by Jerri") and episode 11 ("Nice Guys Finish Last") and as a co-producer with Douglas for season 2 episode 2 ("A Kiss is Just a Kiss").

Ajaye is the author of Comic Insights: The Art of Standup Comedy, which contains interviews with Jerry Seinfeld, Chris Rock, Bill Maher, Ellen DeGeneres, and other famous stand up comedians offering valuable advice for aspiring comedians. His comedic influences include Richard Pryor, George Carlin, Robert Klein, Bill Cosby, and Nichols and May.

Influence
On his stand-up television show Stewart Lee's Comedy Vehicle the British comedian used Ajaye's LP I'm a Comedian, Seriously as the basis of a routine.

Filmography

Film

Television

References

External links
 
 
 Franklyn Ajaye discography at Discogs

1949 births
Living people
Male actors from New York City
African-American male actors
American expatriates in Australia
American male film actors
American stand-up comedians
American male television actors
People from Brooklyn
20th-century American male actors
American people of Sierra Leonean descent
American male comedians
21st-century American male actors
Comedians from New York City
20th-century American comedians
21st-century American comedians
20th-century African-American people
21st-century African-American people